The Hub Oil explosion was an industrial accident that took place on August 9, 1999 in Calgary, Alberta and caused two fatalities. The Hub Oil refinery was located at 5805 17th Ave. S.E., near the eastern edge of Calgary and immediately south of the residential community of Penbrooke.

Historical background

The Kalmacoff family's roots are in Kamsack, Saskatchewan where Jake Kalmacoff Sr. built a conventional crude oil refinery in the ‘30s which also re-refined used lube oil for the Air Force during World War II, and was designated essential to the war effort.  His son, Jake Kalmacoff Jr. moved to Calgary with his family in 1958 and acquired the dormant Monarch Refinery in what was then the Village of Hubalta, Alberta.  It had been built in 1939, but only operated for 2 years before being shut down.  Jake Jr. applied similar re-refining technology that the family had developed during the war, and named the business Hub Oil Company Ltd.

Building on past experience, the Company collected and recycled used lubricating oil from industrial and commercial businesses. In the ‘90s, the company began collecting and recycling used oil filters, used plastic oil containers and used antifreeze.  At its height, the facility collected and recycled 15 million litres of used oil annually.

Products

The facility's end product was a base mineral oil that, with additives, could be compounded and blended into a variety of products, including automotive engine oil, transmission fluid, gear oil and other industrial lubricants.  Much of the industrial oil was sold to the potash mines in Saskatchewan.  Because the oil is considered food grade, the potash companies are able to use it as an anti-clumping and dust suppressing spray acceptable for potash that would eventually become fertilizer for the food industry. The metal in the oil filters was used to make rebar for the construction industry; the plastic was used to create myriad recycled materials; and the antifreeze became clean, usable antifreeze once again.

The Fire

For more than nine hours after the initial explosion, the fire raged out of control, fuelled by oil, jet fuel, and propane. Two more major explosions followed shortly after the first.

C S Martin was asleep at a nearby house on Penworth Place at the time of the first explosion. He remembers it vividly. "Since I was three years old, I grew up in Penbrooke and at one point, I lived on Penrith Crescent less than a kilometre from the blast site. The people in the community always talked about the smells coming from Hub Oil. Many people suffered from frequent headaches, and symptoms not unlike those from the community of Lynwood Ridge.  The morning of the blast, I was in bed, and was wakened by the sound of Thunder. I looked out my bedroom window, and the sky was blue, but I thought nothing of it. Moments later, my mother banged on the door and told me to wake up, as she thought Hub Oil had exploded; as she always thought it would. We drove to a pedestrian bridge over train tracks close to a mobile home park close to the blast, and from that vantage point about 35 feet above the horizon, we could see the damage and feel the intense heat from the flame. Later, a very large radius including this bridge, and up to 100 feet from my home were evacuated. My family decided to head south to my Aunt & Uncle's house on Riverside Crescent which I later bought from them in 2011. Safely evacuated, all we could do was watch on the news to see if any more tanks had ruptured and wiped out the community. The fire burned out, and we returned home to find fallout for weeks to come. That day faded into nothing more than a memory."

All three could be heard clearly from the opposite side of Calgary. Many residents of communities near the site dismissed the first blast and resulting plume of smoke as a fire training exercise, as the Calgary Fire Department maintains a training facility about 600 yards south of the site. About 300 nearby residents were evacuated for 20 hours, returning to homes covered in globs of oil, fine dust, and shrapnel from exploded refinery vessels. The Calgary Fire Department lost two truck units in the second explosion, and several firefighters sustained minor injuries. A Calgary Police Service car was also destroyed in the third major blast. In total, three major explosions and more than a dozen minor explosions occurred, which hampered efforts to control the fire. Because there were no major structures threatened, and no significant fuel source to spread the fire a decision was made by the Calgary Fire Department to withdraw to a safe distance and allow the fire to burn itself out considerably before another attempt would be made to put the flames out. Also destroyed in the ensuing fire was the Corral Four Drive In, a four screen drive in theatre that was not open at the time of the accident. The remaining parts of the Drive In were removed in 2001.

The two fatalities of the accident were refinery workers Ryan Silver, 24, and Ryan Eckhard, 26. Both men were killed when the small brick building they were in was completely destroyed by the initial explosion.

An investigation determined that a pressure buildup in a second-hand storage tank caused a massive fireball. Court was told during the trial that the tank that exploded had been sold as scrap 28 years earlier.

The vessel, which was more than two metres in diameter and nine metres in length, was fabricated in 1963 and decommissioned in 1971. Hub Oil purchased it in 1985, but the tank sat unused for another six years until Hub switched its fuel recycling operation from a one-step to a two-step recovery system.

The Trial

Hub Oil eventually pleaded guilty to:
three counts of common nuisance
endangering the public

The company was complimented by the court for identifying the cause of the fire, pleading guilty to the charge of common nuisance, and refusing to lay blame on the employees. The Company paid a fine of $200,000, voluntarily permanently endowed two bursaries totalling $100,000 to SAIT's Workplace Safety program and established a $100,000 trust fund to the children of the two men who died in the fire.

Site Remediation

Following the fire, Hub Oil remained operational on a reduced basis (collection, storage and dispatching) until 2001, at which time the Company voluntarily shut down the business with the intention of promoting urban renewal.  The site was cleared of all unusable structures and damaged oil tanks.  Extensive soil, groundwater and soil vapor testing was begun immediately by WorleyParsons Komex and continues to this day.  In 2003, a groundwater treatment system was voluntarily installed to prevent possible offsite migration of contaminants.  At no time has the Company been under a directive from Alberta Environment as a result of non-compliance under the Environmental Enhancement and Protection Act.  Under questioning in the legislature in June 2007, Minister of the Environment Rob Renner stated, "Hub Oil is working with Alberta Environment, with the various stakeholders... As long as they continue to own that land, as long as they put in place the necessary provisions to ensure that any contamination does not go beyond the land in question, they’re not in contravention of our legislation."

During this time, numerous public meetings were held to keep the community up to date with Hub Oil's remediation plans.  From these meetings, a permanent Stakeholder Group (composed of members of the community, the regulating agencies and elected officials) was established to ensure that the reclamation plan was acceptable and complete.

In April 2008, Alberta Environment approved Hub Oil's Remediation and Reclamation plan.  The plan includes the presently operating water containment system, a proposed 1.2 metre clay cap over the site, and extensive groundwater and soil vapour monitoring, testing and reporting for the next 10 years.  The plan also calls for continued reporting to Stakeholders as the Company proceeds with development of the site to ensure that they are kept current.

Site Redevelopment

Hub Oil is committed to redeveloping the site to the highest-and-best-use.  One development being considered is a technology incubation centre as proposed in the Report commissioned by the Government of Alberta entitled Task Force on Value-added and Technology Commercialization.  The Report recommended the creation of new product commercialization centres.  Such facilities and services would help Alberta start-up and growth-oriented firms develop new products and services.  Examples of sectors of focus would include: green technology, life sciences, advanced materials, nano-technology and geomatics.

See also
 List of explosions

References

External links
Attorney General Public Fatality Inquiry

Explosions in 1999
August 1999 events in Canada
History of Calgary
Industrial fires and explosions in Canada
1999 industrial disasters
1999 in Alberta